Sekal (also Romanized as Sekal and Sekol; also known as Seh Gel) is a village in Bikah Rural District, Bikah District, Rudan County, Hormozgan Province, Iran. At the 2006 census, its population was 2,051, in 421 families.

References 

Populated places in Rudan County